Rähinä Records is the biggest independent rap label in Finland. It was founded 1998 by Elastinen, Iso H, Andu, Tasis, and Uniikki, and started actual business in 2003. The name Rähinä Records is a brand name. The company also has a sublabel Alarm Entertainment to release artists outside the Rähinä Label. Rähinä Records expanded in 2005, and started producing videos. In charge of Rähinä Films is a young director promise Lauri Aalto. Rähinä Records Oy continues to grow and started a clothing line called "Varuste" in 2006.

Artists

Rähinä Records
 Brandon
 Brädi
 Cheek (rapper)
 Fintelligens (Iso H and Elastinen)
 Illi
 Joniveli
 Kapasiteettiyksikkö (Uniikki, Tasis and Andu)
 Puhuva Kone
 Spekti
 Timo Pieni Huijaus
 Wava

Releases

RRCD03: Rähinä Records: Pommi 3 – Perhealbumi (2005)
RRCD04: Brandon: The Outcome (2005)
RRCD05:  (2005)
RRCD06: (2005)
RRCD07: Kapasiteettiyksikkö: Susijengi (2006)
RRCD08: Elastinen: Anna soida (2006)
RRCD09: Cheek: Kasvukipuja (2007)
RRCD10: Iso H: Lähelle on pitkä matka (2007)
RRCD11: Elastinen: E.L.A. (2007)
RRCD12: Kapasiteettiyksikkö: I <3 KY (2008)
RRCD13: Cheek: Kuka sä oot (2008)
RRCD14: Joniveli: Hallittu kaaos (2008)
RRCD15: Fintelligens: Lisää (2008)
RRCD16: Cheek: Jare Henrik Tiihonen (2009)
RRCD17: Redrama: The Getaway (2009)
RRCD18: Uniikki: Juokse poika juokse (2009)
RRCD19: Redrama: Samma på svenska (2009)
RRCD20: Fintelligens: Mun tie tai maantie (2010)
RRCD21: Brädi: Repullinen hiittiä (2010)
RRCD22: Cheek: Jare Henrik Tiihonen 2 (2010)
RRCD23: Puhuva Kone: Jokainen tavallaan (2010 Rähinä Records/Universal Music)
RRCD23: Timo Pieni Huijaus: Emävale (2010)
RRCD24: Rähinä Records: Rähinä 4 Life -kokoelma (2010)
RRCD25: Uniikki: Suurempaa (2011)
RRCD26: Cheek: Jare Henrik Tiihonen 1 & 2 -kokoelma (2011)
RRCD27: Fintelligens: Täytyy tuntuu (2011)
RRCD28: Puhuva Kone: Tää hetki (2011 Rähinä Records/Universal Music)

Mixtapes
Pommi 1 (2003)
Pommi 2 (2003)
 Brandon - This Town: The Mixtape (2004)
 Boy Mike - Heat (2005)
 Elastinen & Timo Pieni Huijaus - E.T.T.E. (2006)
 Boy Mike - Fakir Boyz Vol. 1 (2006)
 Uniikki - Nuor Tolppanen vol. 1 (2008)

External links
Official website

Finnish record labels